Ou Shaoyan (born 17 August 1973) is a Chinese lightweight rower.

Ou was born in 1973 and is from Guangdong, China. She competed in lightweight women's four and won gold at the 1991 World Rowing Championships, and came fourth at the 1992 World Rowing Championships. She changed to the lightweight women's double sculls and won silver at the 1994 World Rowing Championships, came ninth at the 1995 World Rowing Championships, and came ninth at the 1996 Summer Olympics partnered with Li Fei.

Ou then changed to the lightweight women's quad sculls and came fourth at the 1998 World Rowing Championships. At the 2000 Summer Olympics in Sydney, Australia, she partnered with Yu Hua in the lightweight women's double sculls and came tenth. At the 2004 World Rowing Championships, she competed as the cox for the LTA mixed coxed four in one of the adaptive rowing events, and their team came eighth.

References

Chinese female rowers
1973 births
World Rowing Championships medalists for China
Asian Games medalists in rowing
Asian Games gold medalists for China
Rowers at the 1994 Asian Games
Medalists at the 1994 Asian Games
Rowers at the 1998 Asian Games
Medalists at the 1998 Asian Games
Living people
Rowers at the 2000 Summer Olympics
Rowers at the 1996 Summer Olympics
Olympic rowers of China
Rowers from Guangdong
20th-century Chinese women
21st-century Chinese women